Jai Maharashtra is a 24/7 Marathi news channel launched on 1 May 2013. The Amruta Khanvilkar owns the channel. Its broadcasting area is Maharashtra, India. This channel is available on the direct to home providers such as Tata Sky and Dish TV. It was previously available on Videocon d2h.

During the COVID-19 pandemic in Maharashtra, fifteen of the channel's employees tested positive for coronavirus, mostly reporters and camera operators. The pandemic caused the channel to "effectively shut down" its 12,000 square foot two-studio newsroom in Andheri. Editor Prasad Kathe said "we had to redesign our format to keep it running", referring to the live news channel.

References

External links

Television stations in Mumbai
Marathi-language television channels
Television channels and stations established in 2013